Tasha Rose Inniss is an American mathematician and the director of education and industry outreach for the Institute for Operations Research and the Management Sciences (INFORMS).

Early life and education 
Inniss was born in New Orleans and grew up without a father. She became interested in mathematics in fourth grade, and decided she would study it as a freshman in high school. She studied mathematics at Xavier University of Louisiana, graduating summa cum laude. In 1992 she was listed in the Who's Who Among Colleges and Universities for her academic achievements. She earned a master's degree in applied mathematics from Georgia Institute of Technology.

She moved to the University of Maryland for her PhD, funded by the David and Lucile Packard Foundation. In 2000, Inniss became the first African American woman to obtain a Ph.D. from the University of Maryland, together with Sherry Scott and Kimberly Weems. Her dissertation was Stochastic Models for the Estimation of Airport Arrival Capacity Distributions. She was part of the National Center of Excellence for Aviation Operators and advised by Michael Owen Ball. Her brother, Enos Inniss, also completed his PhD in 2000.

Research and career 
In 2001 she was appointed the Clare Boothe Luce Professor of Mathematics at Trinity Washington University. Her doctoral thesis described programming methods to calibrate models to estimate airport capacity. She remains a consultant for the Federal Aviation Administration.

She joined the department of mathematics at Spelman College in 2005 as an assistant professor.

Throughout her career she has worked to recruit, support and mentor underrepresented minority students. She led a National Science Foundation project that looked to increase the quality and quantity of underrepresented minorities matriculating and completing doctoral degrees. She has contributed to the EDGE Foundation (Enhancing Diversity in Graduate Education) program.

In 2017 she joined the Institute for Operations Research and the Management Sciences as Director of Education.

Inniss' work earned her recognition by Mathematically Gifted & Black as a Black History Month 2017 Honoree.

References 

African-American mathematicians
American women mathematicians
21st-century American mathematicians
Xavier University of Louisiana alumni
University of Maryland, College Park alumni
Scientists from New Orleans
Mathematicians from Louisiana
Living people
Trinity Washington University faculty
Spelman College faculty
21st-century women mathematicians
Year of birth missing (living people)
21st-century American women